Nation Group (Thailand) Public Company Limited (NATION) is one of Thailand's largest media companies. The company operates two digital television stations, three national newspapers (English, Thai business, and Thai mass circulation), a university, a book and cartoon unit, printing and logistics operations, and new media and digital platforms. Its symbol on the Stock Exchange of Thailand (SET) is "NATION".

History
Nation Group was founded on 1 July 1971 by a group of Thai journalists with the launch of The Voice of the Nation, an English language newspaper. It was later renamed The Nation with the motto "Thailand's Independent Newspaper". The company later expanded into Thai business newspaper publishing and television media, both of which are number one in their respective news categories in Thailand. Nation Group is a founding member of Asia News Network, an alliance of 21 media in 19 Asian countries.

In January 2018 the Nation Multimedia Group, in a hostile acquisition, was taken over by Sontiyan Chuenruetainaidhama, founder of conservative outlets T News and INN News.

Significant developments

 1971: Nation Group founded to publish the country's first Thai-owned and managed English newspaper.
 1976: Business Review Co established to publish The Nation Review newspaper, forerunner of The Nation.
 1987: Krungthep Turakij launched as a daily Thai-language business newspaper.
 1988: Company renamed "Nation Publishing Group Co Ltd" in preparation for listing on the Stock Exchange of Thailand (SET).
 1990: License received to locally print and distribute The Asian Wall Street Journal and Yomiuri Shimbun.
 1992: Nation Radio established and two new publications launched, Nation Weekender and Nation Junior.
 1996: Company renamed "Nation Multimedia Group Public Company Limited".
 2000: Nation Channel, Thailand's first 24-hour news television station began broadcasts.
 2001: Kom Chad Luek launched as a daily Thai-language mass-circulation newspaper.
 2002: Nation Books established to support rising demand in the paperback industry.
 2005: WPS (Thailand) Co Ltd established to handle the printing business.
 2006: Kyodo Nation Printing Services Co Ltd launched to provide commercial printing services.
 2011: Nation U Co Ltd established to operate Nation University.
 2013: Licenses received to operate two digital television channels, "NOW 26" and "Nation TV".
 2019: Paper issues of the English-language daily The Nation  will be discontinued, replaced by an online edition. The last paper copy will be the 28 June edition.
 2020: There was a consumer activism campaign against sponsors of Nation Multimedia Group during the 2020 Thai protests due to the former's "pro-establishment bias".
 2022: Company renamed "Nation Group (Thailand) Public Company Limited"

Organization
The Nation Group operates eight business units:

 Thai-language Business News Unit, Krungthep Media Company Limited (KTM) 
 General Thai News Business Unit, Kom Chad Luek Media Company Limited (KMM)
 English News Business Unit, Nation News Network Company Limited (NNN)
 Digital TV Business Unit
 Spring 26 Digital TV Channel: Spring 26 Company Limited 
 Nation TV 22: Nation TV Company Limited (NTV)
 Edutainment and International Business Business Unit, Nation International Edutainment PLC.
 Printing Business Unit, WPS (Thailand) Company Limited (WPS)
 Logistics Business Unit, NML Co., Ltd.
 Education Business Unit, Nation U Co., Ltd.

Publications
The Nation Multimedia Group publishes the following:
 Krungthep Thurakij (Bangkok Business News): A daily Thai-language business newspaper with circulation in the 80,000-100,000 range. This paper is also popular with Thai intellectuals. Its political stance is progressive.
 Kom Chad Luek (Sharp, Clear, Deep): A mass-circulation, Thai-language daily, with circulation in the 500,000-600,000 range. It was launched in 2001.
The Nation: An English-language daily with circulation in the 60,000-80,000 range. Maintains a progressive editorial line.
 NJ Digital: A youth-targeted multimedia English learning.
 Nation Weekend: A weekly Thai-language news magazine.

See also
Media in Thailand

References

External links 
 Nation Group

 
News Network Corporation
Mass media companies of Thailand
Mass media companies established in 1971
Companies listed on the Stock Exchange of Thailand
1971 establishments in Thailand
Mass media in Bangkok